Horace Ronald Phillips (3 June 1921 – 11 January 2007) was an Australian rules footballer who played with North Adelaide in the SANFL. He won back to back Magarey Medals in 1948 and 1949, the only other North Adelaide player to achieve this feat is Tommy MacKenzie.

He was born on 3 June 1921 in Peterborough, South Australia to Horace Norman Phillips and Winifred Lena Phillips (née Cosgrove).

Phillips was a very versatile footballer and played in most positions during his 139-game career. His 1948 Magarey Medal win was at centre half back and he won the award the following season when playing at centre half forward. From 1949 to 1952 he topped North Adelaide's goalkicking, with his best tally of 66 goals coming in 1952. He also played interstate football for South Australia, making a total of 10 appearances.

References

External links

1921 births
2007 deaths
North Adelaide Football Club players
Magarey Medal winners
Australian rules footballers from South Australia
South Australian Football Hall of Fame inductees
People from Peterborough, South Australia
Australian Army personnel of World War II
Australian Army soldiers